Indarbela is a genus of moths in the family Metarbelidae described by Thomas Bainbrigge Fletcher in 1922.

Description
Species of the genus have minute palpi. Its antennae are bipectinated (comb like on both sides) to the tips in males, the branches short and simple in females. Mid and hind tibia slightly hairy, with minute terminal pairs of spurs. Forewings with veins 7, 8 and 9 stalked together. Hindwings with the cell of normal length. Vein 6 given off below the angle. Vein 8 connected with the subcostal nervure by an oblique bar near center of cell.

Species
 Indarbela campbelli Hampson, 1910
 Indarbela dea Swinhoe, 1890
 Indarbela discipuncta Wileman, 1915
 Indarbela magma de Joannis, 1929
 Indarbela manes Druce, 1898
 Indarbela millemaculata Hampson, 1897
 Indarbela minima Hampson, 1910
 Indarbela naida Dyar, 1913
 Indarbela nais Druce, 1898
 Indarbela necreros Dyar, 1914
 Indarbela norax Druce, 1898
 Indarbela obliquifasciata Mell, 1923
 Indarbela orima Druce, 1906
 Indarbela pardicolor Moore, 1879
 Indarbela phaga Swinhoe, 1894
 Indarbela quadrinotata Walker, 1856
 Indarbela salara Druce, 1900
 Indarbela tacita Druce, 1898
 Indarbela tegula Distant, 1897
 Indarbela tesselatus Moore, 1879
 Indarbela tetraonis Moore, 1879
 Indarbela theivora Hampson, 1910
 Indarbela watsoni Hampson, 1900

Former species
 Indarbela acutistriata Mell, 1923
 Indarbela disciplaga Swinhoe, 1901
 Indarbela flavina Mell, 1923
 Indarbela kinabalua Holloway, 1976
 Indarbela philobia Druce, 1898

References

External links

Metarbelinae